The Black Carpet is a show that aired on BET. It presented news and gossip about African-American celebrities. BET aired the show weekly after its original premiere on July 13, 2006, when it replaced BET Style. The show's hosts were Touré and Danella.

Touré confirmed that the show was cancelled in late 2008. The last episode was aired on December 24, 2008.

References 

 THE BLACK CARPET at bet.mediaroom.com

BET original programming
2006 American television series debuts
2008 American television series endings